The Morpeth Arms is a public house at 58 Millbank, in the Pimlico district of London.  It was built in 1845 to refresh prison warders serving at the Millbank Penitentiary.

It now contains a Spying Room which provides a good view of the headquarters of the Secret Intelligence Service MI6 across the river Thames.  The building is listed as Grade II and it is now part of the Young's estate.

References

External links
 Official website

Grade II listed pubs in the City of Westminster
Pimlico